White Writing: On the Culture of Letters in South Africa is a collection of essays by Nobel-laureate J. M. Coetzee, originally published in 1988, and in 2007 was reprinted, with a new introduction, by Pentz Publishers.

"Since it first appeared in 1988, JM Coetzee's first volume of criticism has emerged as an indispensable reference in the study of South African literature. In the seven essays comprising the collection, he reads a range of texts, in various genres, which represent the endeavours of white writers to come to terms with the South African landscape and their tenuous place within it. The seven essays concern a wide range of works written in both English and Afrikaans, including the nineteenth-century travel writing of William Burchell, which compares the landscapes of England and South Africa, always to the latter's detriment, is discussed in relation to subsequent engagements by Thomas Pringle, WEG Louw, WC Scully and Roy Campbell. In addition to landscape, land ownership and pastoralist ideologies, the studies address the versions of race developed, implicitly or explicitly, in writings by authors as diverse as Pauline Smith, Mikro, Alan Paton and Gertrude Millin."

References

Books about apartheid
Essay collections by J. M. Coetzee
1988 books
White South African culture
Works about white people